The Madonna with Child is a tempera painting, transferred to canvas, by Renaissance artist Carlo Crivelli. It is a Madonna painting dating to c. 1470.

It was painted with tempera on wood, then transferred to canvas. It was a piece of an altar in the Church of the Osservanti in Macerata, Marche, Italy. It is now located in the Pinacoteca di Macerata.

See also
 Roman Catholic Marian art

1470 paintings
Paintings of the Madonna and Child by Carlo Crivelli
Macerata
Paintings in Marche